The Rutt/Etra Video Synthesizer is an analog raster manipulation device for image processing and real-time animation. The Rutt/Etra was co-invented by Steve Rutt and Bill Etra.

See also
Scanimate – a similar device

References

External links
Audio Vizualizers page on Rutt / Etra Video Synthesizer 

Image processing